Sailendra Narayana Ghoshal Sastri (5 March 19288 September 1988) was a Vedic scholar and director of The Vedic Research Institute.

Biography

Birth and Education
Sailendra Narayana was born in Kaliara Village, West Midnapur, West Bengal, India, to a devout family. His parents were Agnihotri Brahmin Sashibhushan Ghoshal and Prabhabati Devi. Sailendra Narayana was a meritorious student since childhood. He stood first in the Matric exam in Midnapur district from Midnapur B H Institute. He passed I.Sc.in first Division from Midnapore College.He got Honors in Sanskrit from Scottish Church College, Calcutta. He used to take lessons of Vedic literature from his father. Later he completed M.A. in Sanskrit and Philosophy from University of Calcutta.

Narmada Parikrama
After completing post-graduation (M.A.), he went for Narmada Parikrama, the pilgrimage travel around the bank of river Narmada, in barefoot, where he met with many Sages and had some extraordinary experiences. In that austere journey, he discovered many mysterious facts about Hindu Philosophy and many rare manuscripts of Sanskrit books like Rudra Hridaya Upanishad or Agama literature. The entire journey is described in his famous travelogue Tapobhumi Narmada.

Contribution to Indian philosophy

According to his father's wish, he traveled all over the India four times. He visited Kedar-Vadri, Kailash, Manas Sarovar, Satapanth, Kashmir, Varanasi etc. and got accompany of many Sages. In his debut book Alok Tirtha, published on 1958, he tried put on the light over many misconceptions of Idolatry, Ramayana, Mahabharata, Bhagavad etc. Though many of the conservative Hindus of that time protested him, famous personalities like Soumendranath Tagore, Sukumar Sen (linguist), historian Radha Kumud Mukherjee, philosopher Jagadish Chandra Chattopadhyay, bard Akshay Kumar Boral admired his work. He replied to his critics in his second book Alok Vandana(1959). Later in 1969, he founded - The Vedic Research Institute where he used to reply all questions of his followers on every Tuesdays from the vedic point of views.

Bibliography

Published Works
 Tapobhumi Narmada 
 Alok Tirtha (1958)
 Alok Vandana (1959)
 Pitarou (1980)

Unpublished Works
 Science in Vedas
 Prachin bharoter juddho vidya
 Vedant Sar
 Patanjali Yoga Darshans
 Vedic Bharata

See also
 Akshay Kumar Boral
 Narmada River
 Soumendranath Tagore
 Vedic scholars

References

External links
 Tapobhumi Narmada
 Narmada Parikrama

1928 births
1987 deaths
Indian Vedic scholars
People from Paschim Medinipur district
20th-century Indian educational theorists
Scholars from West Bengal